Schlosberg is a surname. Notable people with the surname include:

Carol Schlosberg (1957–1998), American painter
David Schlosberg, American political theorist
Deia Schlosberg, American documentary filmmaker
Harold H. Schlosberg (1904–1964), American psychologist
Hilton Schlosberg, British billionaire
Lev Schlosberg (born 1963), Russian politician, activist and journalist
Richard T. Schlosberg, American businessman
Rowan Schlosberg, British actor

See also
Schlossberg (disambiguation)